Riverwind Casino is a casino located in Norman,Oklahoma that opened in 2006. The  casino, owned and operated by the Chickasaw Nation is one of the largest in the state. In addition to the casino floor, the facility also has two restaurants, a lounge, a food court, several bars, valet parking and a 1500-seat theatre that hosts concerts. Riverwind also opened a 100-room adjoining hotel in February 2009. The casino is located in at the Interstate 35/State Highway 9 west junction.

Games
Riverwind casino houses over 2,700 slot machines and 20 gaming tables such as blackjack, Mississippi stud, Baccarat, Three Card Poker, Card-Based Roulette and Ultimate Texas Hold'em and 17 poker tables. It also has an off-track betting area.

Music and entertainment
Riverwind features musical and entertainment acts on many occasions during the year. In addition to the 1500-seat Showplace Theatre, the smaller 77-seat River Lounge, located near the northeast entrance, also features regular live musical performances as well as a full-service bar.

Dining
Along with several bars and a food court, Riverwind Casino has two restaurants. Current options include, Chips & Ale's, River Buffet, Panda Express, Burger King, IHOP, and Taco Bueno.  )

Riverwind Hotel

Opened in February 2009, the 100-room Riverwind Hotel is adjoined to the casino by a skybridge. 

Riverwind Casino was designed by The Hnedak Bobo Group of Las Vegas and Memphis. The Chickasaw Nation Division of Commerce has also developed non-gaming projects. Chickasaw Nation Division of Commerce built a $1.7 million sewage treatment plant for Goldsby and a $2.1 million water tower for Newcastle.

References

Casinos in Oklahoma
Chickasaw Nation casinos
Buildings and structures in McClain County, Oklahoma
Tourist attractions in McClain County, Oklahoma